The Royal Brewery of Krušovice (short form Krušovice) is a Czech brewery, established in 1581 in Krušovice.

History
The brewery was established in 1581. It was sold to Emperor Rudolf II in 1583, and the Imperial Crown of Austria became part of the company's logo. Arnošt Josef Waldstein bought the brewery in 1685.

After 1945, the Krušovice Brewery was a state-owned company. The brewery was privatised in 1993, and began exporting to the United States and United Kingdom. The company was acquired by Heineken in 2007.

Brands
Krušovice 10 – a pale 10.3° draught beer with 4.2% ABV
Krušovice Lager – a pale 12° lager with 4.8% ABV
Krušovice 12 – a pale 12.3° lager with 5.0% ABV
Krušovice Dark – a dark 9.7° beer with 3.8% ABV
Krušovice Mušketýr Filtr – a pale 10.9° draught beer with 4.5% ABV.
Krušovice Mušketýr Nefiltr – an unfiltered 11.8° lager with 4.9% ABV.
Krušovice Malvaz – a semi-dark 13° lager with 5.6% ABV
Krušovice Pšeničné – an unfiltered 11.5° wheat beer with 4.3% ABV.

See also
Beer in the Czech Republic

References

External links

Breweries in the Czech Republic
Beer brands of the Czech Republic